The first season of the American animated television series Gravity Falls consisted of 20 episodes on the Disney Channel, and aired from June 15, 2012 to August 2, 2013.

Development

Premise and plot
The season revolves around the various antics of two fraternal twins, Dipper and Mabel Pines, who were handed over to their Great Uncle (or "Grunkle") Stan, who runs a tourist trap called The Mystery Shack, in the town of Gravity Falls, Oregon. They soon realize that the town holds many secrets, and when Dipper obtains a book that he finds in the magical land he’s transported to, he and Mabel find their everyday life changes. Alongside them in their antics are Soos and Wendy Corduroy, who work for The Mystery Shack, the latter of whom Dipper has a crush on.

Prior to working on the series, series creator Alex Hirsch's primary inspiration growing up was the popular animated sitcom The Simpsons, where he observed that "animation could be funnier than live-action. That animation didn't have to just be for kids. That it could be satirical and observational and grounded in a sense of character interaction". Hirsch graduated from the California Institute of the Arts, and was hired to work as writer and storyboard artist for the Cartoon Network series The Marvelous Misadventures of Flapjack, where he was paired up with Pendleton Ward, the creator of Adventure Time. Afterwards, he moved on to co-develop the Disney Channel animated series Fish Hooks, shortly before he pitched (and was subsequently green-lit) Gravity Falls.

Production
Hirsch explained in an interview with The A.V. Club during production of season 1, that a typical episode is conceived in a room reserved for writers, where a simple synopsis is presented, and from then on dramatic structure is defined, and the plot is modified to include a character-driven subplot, which Hirsch expresses as "the hardest thing... to find a character story that actually uncovers, explores, or pushes tension – on something our characters care about – that is properly explored via the magic or monster or impossibility of the week."

B- and A-stories are created, and are given to a writer to produce an outline, which is then subsequently checked-off by Hirsch for feedback. The writer produces a draft from these edits, where more notes may be given. Hirsch states that he and creative director Mike Rianda may personally create a draft for themselves before a final script is produced, in which the dialogue from the draft received from the writer is majorly revised; Hirsch states that the revising process "is not a discredit to our writers – it's just we have a very particular vision. In particular, I usually rewrite almost all of Dipper's dialogue and most of Mabel's dialogue, just because I have them in my head. Me and Mike will stay up for about 48 hours prior to the delivery of every script. We'll take the weekend, we'll work all night, we'll drink Red Bull, we'll sleep on the couch in shifts like maniacs, we'll slap each other in the face".

A script is delivered, which then gets translated into a storyboard, where feedback is received from Hirsch to the board artists if a certain element, such as a gag, doesn't work. Afterwards, a pitch for the episode is given to the network, where they do a read-through, and then the episode is either checked out by the network, or retooled in the small amount of time allocated before an animation studio must receive something to work with.

Cast

The main characters comprises the voices of Jason Ritter as Dipper and Kristen Schaal as Mabel, with series creator Alex Hirsch portraying Grunkle Stan and Soos, and Wendy Corduroy played by Linda Cardellini. Hirsch stated in an interview, tongue-in-cheek, on the role of Mabel that he "knew from the get-go that it's got to be [Schaal] or there's no show. I would've just stopped working. If we hadn't gotten her, I would have probably quit".

Of the recurring characters comprises the voices of Dee Bradley Baker as Mabel's pet pig, Waddles, and Hirsch also playing Old Man McGucket, the "local kook" of the town. Kevin Michael Richardson plays Sheriff Blubs, with partner Deputy Durland being voiced by Keith Ferguson. Frank Welker voices Gompers, a goat who lives in the forest of Gravity Falls. Voice acting veteran John DiMaggio plays Manly Dan, a strong lumberjack and father of Wendy. Niki Yang plays Candy Chiu and Carl Faruolo plays Grenda, two of Mabel's best friends. Toby Determined, a journalist for Gravity Falls' Gossiper, is voiced by Gregg Turkington, and Will Forte plays Tyler Cutebiker.

The series commissions various guest stars to voice characters who portray one-shot characters, or in some cases, cameos of themselves, as is the case in "Headhunters", where both Larry King and Coolio can be seen as wax sculptures of themselves. Other voices include John Oliver, who plays a wax figure of Sherlock Holmes (also featured in "Headhunters"), Alfred Molina as Multi-Bear and Jennifer Coolidge as Lazy Suzan in the episode "Dipper vs. Manliness". Justin Roiland plays a time traveler by the name of Blendin Blandin in "The Time Traveler's Pig". Brian Bloom is the voice of Rumble McSkirmish, a video game character featured in the episode "Fight Fighters". Corey Burton voices an unnamed lawyer in "Little Dipper". Jeff Bennett plays the role of The Summerween Trickster in the episode "Summerween". Matt Chapman and Mike Rianda both voice Mermando and Mr. Poolcheck respectively, in the episode "The Deep End". Lance Bass voices the band consisting of clones, Sev'ral Timez, in the episode "Boyz Crazy"; Matt Chapman returns to voice some members of the band. Greg Cipes and John Roberts voice Craz and Xyler, characters from the fictional film "Dream Boy High" in the episode "Dreamscaperers".

Broadcast
Internationally this was broadcast in Canada via Disney XD (Canada) with some numbering alterations reflecting the production codes: Headhunters (as Head Hunters) is counted 2 instead of 3 and The Inconveniencing is counted 3 instead of 5.

Episodes
 Production codes for this season start with the string 618G-1 (the first three numbers numerically represent the birth month and date of series creator Alex Hirsch), with the last two numbers representing the order the episodes were produced in, which may not represent the order in which they air.
 Episode 19 has been released on different platforms under two names: "Dreamscaperers" and "Dreamscapers".

Ratings
The season received wide acclaim from critics.

References

2012 American television seasons
2013 American television seasons
Gravity Falls seasons